Need for achievement (N-Ach) is an individual's desire for significant accomplishment, mastering of skills, control, or high standards. The term was first used by Henry Murray and associated with a range of actions. These include: "intense, prolonged and repeated efforts to accomplish something difficult. To work with singleness of purpose towards a high and distant goal. To have the determination to win". The concept of N-Ach was subsequently popularized by the psychologist David McClelland.


Overview 
This personality trait is characterized by an enduring and consistent concern with setting and meeting high standards of achievement. This need is influenced by internal drive for action (intrinsic motivation), and the pressure exerted by the expectations of others (extrinsic motivation). Measured with the thematic apperception test (TAT), need for achievement motivates an individual to succeed in competition, and to excel in activities important to them.

Need for Achievement is related to the difficulty of tasks people choose to undertake. Those with low N-Ach may choose very easy tasks, in order to minimize risk of failure, or highly difficult tasks, such that a failure would not be embarrassing. Those with high N-Ach tend to choose moderately difficult tasks, feeling that they are challenging, but within reach.

People high in N-Ach are characterized by a tendency to seek challenges and a high degree of independence. Their most satisfying reward is the recognition of their achievements.
Sources of high N-Ach include:
 Parents who encouraged independence in childhood
 Praise and rewards for success
 Association of achievement with positive feelings
 Association of achievement with one's own competence and effort, not luck
 A desire to be effective or challenged
 Intrapersonal Strength
 Desirability 
Feasibility 
Goal Setting Abilities

In the work place, organizations can find it hard to recognize those who are high in the N-Ach and those who are not.  When people who need and require the necessary attention for their efforts to be recognized by someone who is in an influential position to them, not receiving the satisfaction or recognition they desire could cause them to become dissatisfied and frustrated with their work or position. This can lead to a myriad of problems in the job and self-resentment and disapproval.

This can be seen as a negative emotional reaction, however in turn, as we learned from David McClelland, the need for achievement will take its course in different ways. A person will either take small easy tasks that they know they can accomplish and be congratulated for, or they will accept extremely challenging tasks because the high demand eliminates the embarrassment of failure. It has been found that employees motivated by the need for achievement tend to be the risk takers in the organization. They are also the employees that want to constantly be challenged to learn new things.
These people tend to become very absorbed in their work. This is why they require recognition when a task is completed.

So, If a risk taker becomes dissatisfied due to the lack or appreciation for their work, they will either continue to work and take more risks and be creative and try harder to impress and gain recognition, or they will go find somewhere else to work. In this manner, employers, managers, colleagues, and co-workers, need to respect everyone who has a need for achievement personality and give them the credit they require to keep them happy. This will lead to a productive, happy, and well established work force. Here are some road blocks for those that those who have a high need for achievement. David McClelland suggested other characteristics and attitudes of achievement-motivated people:

 Achievement is more important than material or financial reward.
 Achieving the aim or task gives greater personal satisfaction than receiving praise or recognition.
 Financial reward is regarded as a measurement of success, not an end in itself.
 Security is not prime motivator, nor is status.
 Feedback is essential, because it enables measurement of success, not for reasons of praise or recognition (the implication here is that feedback must be reliable, quantifiable and factual).
 Achievement-motivated people constantly seek improvements and ways of doing things better.

Theory
The pioneering research work of the Harvard Psychological Clinic in the 1930s, summarized in Explorations in Personality, provided the start point for future studies of personality, especially those relating to needs and motives. David C. McClelland's and his associates' investigations of achievement motivation have particular relevance to the emergence of leadership. McClelland was interested in the possibility of deliberately arousing a motive to achieve in an attempt to explain how individuals express their preferences for particular outcomes—a general problem of motivation. In this connection, the need for achievement refers to an individual's preference for success under conditions of competition. The vehicle McClelland employed to establish the presence of an achievement motive was the type of fantasy a person expressed on the Thematic Apperception Test (TAT), developed by Christiana Morgan and Henry Murray, who note in Explorations in Personality that "...when a person interprets an ambiguous social situation he is apt to expose his own personality as much as the phenomenon to which he is attending... Each picture should suggest some critical situation and be effective in evoking a fantasy relating to it" (p531). The test is composed of a series of pictures that subjects are asked to interpret and describe to the psychologist. The TAT has been widely used to support assessment of needs and motives.

In 1961 McClelland published The Achieving Society, which articulated his model of human motivation. McClelland contended that three dominant needs -for achievement, for power, and for affiliation- underpin human motivation. McClelland believed that the relative importance of each need varies among individuals and cultures.  Arguing that commonly used hiring tests using IQ and personality assessments were poor predictors of competency, McClelland proposed that companies should base hiring decisions on demonstrated competency in relevant fields, rather than on standardized test scores.  Iconoclastic in their time, McClelland’s ideas have become standard practice in many corporations.

The procedure in McClelland's initial investigation was to arouse in the test audience a concern with their achievement. A control group was used in which arousal was omitted. In the course of this experiment, McClelland discovered through analyzing the stories on the TAT that initial arousal was not necessary. Instead, members of the control group — individuals who had had no prior arousal — demonstrated significant differences in their stories, some writing stories with a high achievement content and some submitting stories with a low achievement content. Using results based on the Thematic Apperception Test, McClelland demonstrated that individuals in a society can be grouped into high achievers and low achievers based on their scores on what he called "N-Ach".

McClelland and his associates have since extended their work in fantasy analysis to include different age groups, occupational groups, and nationalities in their investigations of the strength of need for achievement. These investigations have indicated that the N-Ach score increases with a rise in occupational level. Invariably, businessmen, managers, and entrepreneurs are high scorers. Other investigations into the characteristics of the high achievers have revealed that accomplishment on the job represents an end in itself; monetary rewards serve as an index of this accomplishment. In addition, these other studies found that the high achievers, though identified as managers, businessmen, and entrepreneurs, are not gamblers. A high emotional intelligence calls for a high need for achievement while a low emotional intelligence calls for a lower need for achievement. They will accept risk only to the degree they believe their personal contributions will make a difference in the outcome.

An experiment realized to entry level managers of AT&T from 1956 to 1960, studied the level of achievement attained during a period of 8 to 16 years, showing that High n-Achievement was associated with managerial success at lower levels of management jobs, in which promotion depends more on individual contributions than it does at higher levels. At the higher levels, in which promotion depends on demonstrated ability to manage others, a high n-Achievement is not associated with success; by contrast, the leadership motive pattern is so associated, in all likelihood because it involves a high n-Power, emerging as a concern for influencing people.

These explorations into the achievement motive seem to turn naturally into the investigation of national differences based on Max Weber's thesis that the industrialization and economic development of the Western nations were related to the Protestant ethic and its corresponding values supporting work and achievement. McClelland and his associates have satisfied themselves that such a relationship, viewed historically through an index of national power consumption, indeed exists. Differences related to individual, as well as to national, accomplishments depend on the presence or absence of an achievement motive in addition to economic resources or the infusion of financial assistance. High achievers can be viewed as satisfying a need for self-actualization through accomplishments in their job assignments as a result of their particular knowledge, their particular experiences, and the particular environments in which they have lived.

Measurement 

The techniques McClelland and his collaborators developed to measure N-Ach, N-Affil and N-Pow (see McClelland et al., 1958) can be viewed as a radical break with the dominant psychometric tradition. However, it should be recognized that McClelland's thinking was strongly influenced by the pioneering work of Henry Murray, both in terms of Murray's model of human needs and motivational processes (1938) and his work with the OSS during World War Two. It was during this period that Murray introduced the idea of "situation tests" and multi-rater / multi-method assessments. It was Murray who first identified the significance of Need for Achievement, Power and Affiliation and placed these in the context of an integrated motivational model.

Whilst trait-based personality theory assume that high-level competencies like initiative, creativity, and leadership can be assessed using "internally consistent" measures (see psychometrics), the McClelland measures recognize that such competencies are difficult and demanding activities which will neither be developed nor displayed unless people are undertaking activities they care about (i.e. are strongly motivated to undertake). Furthermore, it is the cumulative number of independent, but cumulative and substitutable, components of competence they bring to bear while seeking to carry out these activities that will determine their success. Accordingly, the N-Ach, N-Aff and N-Pow scoring systems simply count how many components of competence people bring to bear whilst carrying out activities they have a strong personal inclination (or motivation) to undertake.

McClelland’s research led him to formulate psychological characteristics of persons with strong need for achievement.  According to McClelland and David Winter (Motivating Economic Achievement), the following features accompany high level of achievement motivation:

 Moderate risk propensity; 
 Undertaking innovative and engaging tasks; 
 Internal locus of control and responsibility for own decisions and behaviors; 
 Need for precise goal setting.

See also
 Goal orientation
 Need for affiliation
 Need for cognition
 Need for power
 Need theory

Further reading
 Lenk, H (1979). Social Philosophy of Athletics: A Pluralistic and Practice-Oriented Philosophical Analysis of Top Level Amateur Sport. Stipes Pub Llc.
 McClelland, D. C., Atkinson, J. W., Clark, R. A., & Lowell, E. L. (1958). A scoring manual for the achievement motive; R. W. Heyns, J. Veroff, & J. W. Atkinson, A scoring manual for the affiliation motive; J. Veroff, A scoring manual for the power motive. Respectively, Chapters 12, 13 and 14 in J. W. Atkinson (Ed.), Motives in Fantasy, Action and Society. New York: Van Nostrand.
 Raven, J. (2001). The McClelland/McBer Competency Models. Chapter 15 in J. Raven & J. Stephenson (Eds.), Competence in the Learning Society. New York: Peter Lang.
 Breidebach, G. (2012). Bildungsbenachteiligung. Warum die einen nicht können und die anderen nicht wollen. Hamburg: Dr Kovac Verlag.

References 

Motivational theories